Camoola was a rural locality within the Longreach Region, Queensland, Australia, situated between the towns of Longreach and Muttaburra. It has been amalgamated into the locality of Longreach.

History 

In January 2019, it was decided to reduce the number of localities within Longreach Region by amalgamating the localities to the north and west of the town of Longreach into the locality of Longreach. The localities amalgamated were: Camoola, Chorregon, Ernestina, Maneroo, Morella, Tocal, and Vergemont. As a consequence of this amalgamation, the Longreach Region has only three localities: Longreach, Ilfracombe and Isisford.

References

External links 
Map showing Camoola before the January 2019 amalgamation (archived on 28 July 2019)

Longreach Region
Unbounded localities in Queensland